Claude Combes (born 22 July 1935 in Perpignan) is a French biologist and parasitologist. He is a professor of animal biology and director of the Centre de Biologie et Écologie Tropicale et Méditerranéenne at the Université de Perpignan.

He got his aggregation of natural sciences in 1958 and a doctoral degree in 1967.

He has received several scientific awards including the CNRS Silver Medal (1986), Skryabin Medal (USSR Academy of Sciences) (1991), Philip Morris Research Prize (1990).

He has been a member of the French Academy of Sciences since 1996.

Books 
 La Vie, 2002 Ellipses (L'esprit des sciences)
 Taxonomie, écologie et évolution des métazoaires parasites. (Taxonomy, ecology and evolution of metazoan parasites), 2003 PUP
 The Art of Being a Parasite, 2005 The University of Chicago Press (2003 in French)
 Encyclopedic Reference of Parasitology, (2nd edition, 38 co-authors), 2002 Springer
 Interactions durables. Ecologie et évolution du parasitisme, 1995 Masson (Ecologie, 26)
 L'homme et l'animal. De Lascaux à la vache folle, 1999 Belin (Pour la Science)
 Les associations du vivant : l'art d'être parasite, 2001 Flammarion
 Parasitism. The Ecology and Evolution of Intimate Interactions. 2001 University of Chicago Press

External links 
 The art of being a parasite by Claude Combes, in Google Books.
 A book review by Danny Yee
 short bio

Members of the French Academy of Sciences
1935 births
French parasitologists
Living people